The HTC Touch Pro (also known as the HTC Raphael, AT&T Fuze, XDA Serra, or MDA Vario IV)  is a smart phone from the Touch series of Internet-enabled  Windows Mobile Pocket PC smartphones designed and marketed by HTC Corporation of Taiwan. It is an enhanced version of the HTC Touch Diamond with the addition of a left-side slide-out QWERTY keyboard, a microSD card slot, and a camera flash. The Touch Pro smartphone's  functions include those of a camera phone and a portable media player in addition to text messaging and multimedia messaging. It also offers Internet services including e-mail, instant messaging, web browsing, and local Wi-Fi connectivity. Depending on its market, it is a quad-band GSM or quad-band UMTS phone with GPRS, EDGE, UMTS, HSDPA, and HSUPA or a tri-band CDMA phone with 1xEV-DO Rev A. All versions feature TouchFLO 3D — a new enhanced version of the TouchFLO interface, unique only to the latest Touch series.  In March 2009, HTC announced a new version, the Touch Pro2 which has a larger screen (3.6") and a redesigned slide out (and tilted) QWERTY keyboard with spaces between the keys.

The XDAndroid project makes it possible to run Android on HTC Windows Mobile phones, including the Touch Pro.

Versions

As stated, the HTC Touch Pro has three versions: the Raphael 100, which is GSM or UMTS, the Raphael 800, which is CDMA, and a Verizon-specific CDMA variant with less RAM and a unique keyboard layout, the Raphael 500.  Listed below are various companies that have confirmed or are speculated to carry the Pro along with their carrier version names (if any).

Raphael 100
 AT&T: HTC FUZE (RAPH110 model)
 O2 XDA Serra
 NTT docomo HT01A
 SoftBank Mobile X05HT
/// T-Mobile-UK MDA Vario IV
  Vodafone
Raphael 500
 Verizon
Raphael 800
 Bell Canada
 TELUS(Nov. 19th)
 Alltel
 Sprint
 U.S. Cellular
 au E30HT

Specifications

The following specs are for the retail version of the Pro.  Carriers may sell versions of the Pro with specifications that vary from this.
Screen size: 
Screen resolution: 480×640 pixels at 285 ppi, 3:4 aspect ratio
Screen colors: 65,536 (16-bit)
Input devices: resistive touchscreen interface and slide-out QWERTY keyboard
Battery: 1340 mAh, user-accessible
Battery has up to 6.98 hours of talk and up to 462 hours of standby.
3.2 megapixel rear-facing camera with autofocus and flash, .3 megapixel front-facing camera for video calling (Raphael 100 only.)
Location finding by detection of cell towers and Wi-Fi networks and with internal GPS antenna
Processor: Qualcomm MSM7201A(GSM) MSM7501A(CDMA) (528 MHz ARM ARM1136EJ-S  processor)
RAM: 288 MB DRAM (192 MB for the Verizon SKU)
ROM: 512 MB flash memory
Removable Media: microSDHC, supports up to 32 GB.
Operating System: Windows Mobile 6.1 Professional
Quad-band GSM/GPRS/EDGE (GSM 850, GSM 900, GSM 1800, GSM 1900)
Quad-band UMTS/HSDPA/HSUPA UMTS 850),(UMTS 900, UMTS 1900), UMTS 2100)
Wi-Fi (802.11b/g)
Bluetooth 2.0 + EDR
Mini USB 2.0 (HTC ExtUSB)High speed (480Mbit/s)
TV-out
FM 87.5 – 108 MHz (Only on GSM)
Ambient Light Sensor
Accelerometer
Size:  (h)  (w)  (d)
Weight:

See also
TouchFLO
TouchFLO 3D
HTC Touch Family

References

External links
HTC Touch Pro Press Release
HTC Touch Pro Product Specifications 

Touch Pro
Windows Mobile Professional devices
Mobile phones with an integrated hardware keyboard
Mobile phones with user-replaceable battery